Roswell, now annexed into the city of Colorado Springs, Colorado, was a coal mine settlement near the northern bluffs of Colorado Springs and a 19th-century railroad junction. The town was located at roughly the present intersection of Fillmore Street and North Nevada Avenue in Colorado Springs.

History
(See Tuberculosis treatment in Colorado Springs).

By 1899, he was an investor in mining and the Manitou and Pike's Peak Railway. The town was located on Monument Creek at the junction of the Denver and Rio Grande Western Railroad (D&RG) and Chicago, Rock Island and Pacific Railroads (CRI&P). The Denver and Rio Grande Western Railroad had reached the area about 1875 and in 1889, Roswell had a Chicago, Rock Island and Pacific Railroad (CRI&P) yard. Roswell had a stone Rock Island Round House and an Atchison, Topeka and Santa Fe Railway bridge over the CRI&P railway.

There were 448 residents in 1900. In 1902, Roswell was a "considerable settlement". Its streets included: Brewster, Cable, Elm (a northern city boundary), Holly, Laurel, Low, Myrtle, Parker, Poplar, Rock Island, Roswell, Sage, and part of Cedar. Roswell had a school, Methodist Episcopal Church, and the Roswell Hotel by 1903. That year, the  Roswell Park had an equestrian race track and a ballpark.

According to the 1910 United States Federal census, there were 426 residents in Roswell (El Paso County precinct 22). By 1911, the population had reduced to 250 people.  By 1919, Roswell was a transfer station for coal loads from the Pikeview mine to the north and the Keystone mine  to the east.  In the 1940s, the Roswell race track was used as an automobile speedway.

Notes

References

1880 establishments in Colorado
Populated places established in 1880
Geography of Colorado Springs, Colorado
Neighborhoods in Colorado
Rail junctions in the United States
Former Chicago, Rock Island and Pacific Railroad stations
Former Denver and Rio Grande Western Railroad stations